Wilton is a small village and civil parish near Pickering in North Yorkshire, England. The main road through Wilton (the A170) is still closed daily so as to let the farmer transport cows across it.

References

Villages in North Yorkshire
Civil parishes in North Yorkshire